Biathlon at the 1972 Winter Olympics consisted of two biathlon events, held at Makomanai Biathlon Site. The events began on 9 February and ended on 11 February 1972.

Medal summary

Five nations won medals in biathlon, the Soviet Union and Norway leading the medal table with one gold medal each, while East Germany were the only country to win more than one medal. Hansjörg Knauthe, who was part of both East German medals, was the only athlete to win more than one medal.

Medal table

Events

Participating nations
Fourteen nations sent biathletes to compete in Sapporo. Below is a list of the competing nations; in parentheses are the number of national competitors. Italy made its Olympic biathlon debut.

References

 
1972
1972 Winter Olympics events
1972 in biathlon
Biathlon competitions in Japan